HMS Falcon was a river gunboat of the Royal Navy built by Yarrow Shipbuilders in 1931 for the Yangtze Patrol.   The main armament of the gunboat was a 3.7-inch howitzer, and the secondary armament was a QF 6 pounder Nordenfelt. For air defense, the gunboat is armed with ten machine guns that couild also be used against surface targets.

During World War II, HMS Falcon had to withdraw to the Chinese war time capital Chongqing, along with the retreating Chinese force to avoid being captured by the advancing Japanese invaders. In March 1941, the gunboat was paid off and her crew travelled overland to Yangon via the Burma Road and her guns were sent by elephants. The British decided to give the boat to Chinese as a gift, and Chinese in turn, began to train its own crew in preparation of the handover. Falcon was officially handed over to Chinese in February 1942, and in the following month, Falcon officially joined the Republic of China Navy (ROCN) and renamed as Yīng dé. The gunboat served with ROCN until 30 November 1949, when the ROCN Riverine Flotilla commander defected to advancing communist force that blocked the Yangtze River, taking seven boats to the communist side, including Yīng dé. After joining the People's Liberation Army Navy (PLAN), the gunboat was once again renamed, this time changed to Nan Chiang, and served until 1974 to its final retirement.

References

Publications
 

Gunboats of the Royal Navy
World War II patrol boats of the United Kingdom
Ships of the Republic of China Navy
Ships of the People's Liberation Army Navy
1931 ships